Port Line may refer to:

Port Line - a British Merchant Navy company
SR Merchant Navy Class 35027 Port Line - a preserved British steam locomotive
 The nickname of the rail route from Dumfries to Stranraer which comprised the Castle Douglas and Dumfries Railway and Portpatrick and Wigtownshire Joint Railway.
Oslo Port Line, a railway line in Norway